The Roland AX-Synth is a keytar that is manufactured by Roland Corporation, and was released in late August 2009. This modernized instrument builds on the features of its predecessor, the Roland AX-7. The most notable change is the addition of an internal synthesizer.  A UV Black-colored "premium" model called "Black Sparkle" was released in September 2010. The AX-Synth has now been discontinued as well.

Features
The AX-Synth extends the keyboard to 49 keys (from the AX-7's 45) and also adds dedicated V-Link functionality to control audio and video onstage. It runs on 8 AA batteries or an external power source. It has 264 built in tones, 128-voice polyphony, and a 3-character LED display. The AX-Synth also has all of the AX-7's stage performance functions such as the touchpad-like pitch bend ribbon, expression bar, sustain switch, and volume control knob, all on the upper neck of the instrument. As with the AX-7, there is also a proprietary "D-Beam" interface, made up of infrared sensors that detect nearby motion.

The AX-Synth also has a wide variety of sounds. Many are synthesised, however, there are many samples of real sounds, from brass to a 'Jazz Scat' sound; this varies depending on the velocity with which the note is played, as seen in "Funky Keytar Duo". The AX-Synth has been often criticized for the large size of the keytar (as seen here dwarfing a large framed Roland rep "Roland AX-SYNTH keytar DEMO") which was necessary to contain all of the sound generating hardware vs. the sleek stylings of previous Roland Keytars like the Roland AX-1 and Roland AX-7.

MIDI functionality 
The AX-Synth has full MIDI functionality like the AX-7, but also adds an internal synthesizer with 128 voice polyphony and stereo output. It has both MIDI in and out ports and as is common with more recent synthesizers, it also has a USB port which can also be used to communicate MIDI messages, and edit the sounds via Roland's free patch editor/librarian software for PC and Mac.

Notable users
French composer Jean-Michel Jarre used a prototype version of the AX-Synth during the first concerts of his 2009 IN>DOORS tour.

Pop star Lady Gaga has several customized versions of the AX-Synth, used for various performances.

Doctor Sung of the Canadian synthfunk band TWRP primarily uses an Ax-Synth.

See also 
 Roland AX-1
 Roland AX-7
 Keytar
 Roland AX-09 Lucina

References

External links 

 Official Roland AX-Synth website

Keytars
MIDI controllers
Digital synthesizers